Beryl Alaine Howell (born December 3, 1956) is a judge of the United States District Court for the District of Columbia. She was the chief judge of the court for a seven year term ending March 16, 2023. As chief judge, she supervised federal grand juries in the District, including for the Mueller special counsel investigation into Russian interference in the 2016 United States elections and investigations into attempts to overturn the 2020 United States presidential election.

Early life and education
Howell is the daughter of an Army officer. She attended public school in six states and Germany before graduating from Bryn Mawr College with her Bachelor of Arts degree, with honors in Philosophy in 1978 and from Columbia University School of Law with a Juris Doctor in 1983. She is Jewish.

Career

Following law school graduation, Howell clerked for Judge Dickinson Richards Debevoise in the United States District Court for the District of New Jersey from 1983 to 1984. From 1985 to 1987, she was in private practice as an associate at the New York City law firm of Schulte Roth & Zabel.

From 1987 to 1993, Howell was an assistant United States attorney for the United States District Court for the Eastern District of New York, where she became deputy chief of the Narcotics section. From 1993 to 2003, Howell served on the staff of the United States Senate Committee on the Judiciary as a senior advisor to Chairman Patrick Leahy, including as the committee's general counsel starting in 1997.

While working for Senator Leahy, Howell helped craft the E-FOIA amendments, which expanded electronic access to government records. She also helped Sen. Leahy fend off proposals to impose new limits on the FOIA. In 2001, she was honored by the Coalition to Support and Expand the Freedom of Information Act, and in 2004, her FOIA work was honored by the Society of Professional Journalists.

Howell was involved in crafting numerous pieces of legislation for the investigation and prosecution of computer crime and copyright infringement, including the Anti-Cybersquatting Consumer Protection Act, the National Information Infrastructure Protection Act, the Computer Fraud and Abuse Act, the Communications Assistance for Law Enforcement Act (CALEA), the No Electronic Theft Act (NET Act), the Digital Millennium Copyright Act (DMCA), and the Digital Theft Deterrence and Copyright Damages Improvement Act of 1999.

Howell was involved in national security issues, including the creation of the USA PATRIOT Act, which she defended in 2005 in an article for the Pennsylvania Bar Association Quarterly.

The Center for Democracy and Technology lists Howell as a "board alum".

From 2004 to 2010, she served as a member of the United States Sentencing Commission after being appointed by President George W. Bush.

Lobbying
From 2004 to 2009, Howell was executive vice president, executive managing director, and general counsel at Stroz Friedberg, a global digital risk management and investigations firm. Howell's work at Stroz Friedberg included lobbying on behalf of the Recording Industry Association of America, and, briefly, Universal Music Group.

In 2008, Howell served as a member of the Commission on Cybersecurity for the 44th Presidency, sponsored by bipartisan think tank Center for Strategic and International Studies.

Academic 

Howell teaches legal ethics as an adjunct professor at the American University's Washington College of Law.

Federal judicial service

On July 14, 2010, Howell was nominated by President Barack Obama to the seat vacated by Judge Paul L. Friedman, who assumed senior status on December 31, 2009. She was confirmed by the U.S. Senate on December 22, 2010. She received her judicial commission on December 27, 2010. She served as the Chief Judge from March 17, 2016 to March 17, 2023. A 2015 analysis by Ravel Law found Howell to be the second most-cited district court judge appointed in the previous five years.

Notable decisions

In 2011, Harold Hodge Jr. stood outside the U.S. Supreme Court wearing a sign that protested the American government's treatment of black and Hispanic people. He did so in violation of a 1949 federal law that makes such protests a crime. Hodge sued the Marshal of the United States Supreme Court and the U.S. Attorney for the District of Columbia under the First Amendment. In a June 2013 decision, Howell struck down the law as violating the First Amendment's guarantee of free speech. The judge wrote, "The absolute prohibition on expressive activity in the statute is unreasonable, substantially overbroad and irreconcilable with the First Amendment." The defendants appealed the decision to the U.S. Court of Appeals for the District of Columbia, which reversed Howell's decision and reinstated the law as it applies to the Supreme Court Plaza and steps. Hodge v. Talkin, 799 F. 3d 1145 (D.C. Cir. 2015).

In 2018, Howell struck down a regulation of the Federal Election Commission allowing dark money groups, certain nonprofit organizations engaged in political activities, to conceal their donors. She wrote that the regulation "blatantly undercuts the congressional goal of fully disclosing the sources of money flowing into federal political campaigns, and thereby suppresses the benefits intended to accrue from disclosure." 
The Supreme Court later declined to review the decision.

In that same year, Howell became the supervising judge for the grand jury working for special counsel Robert Mueller's investigation into Russian interference in the 2016 United States elections. On October 25, 2019, she ruled in favor of the House Judiciary Committee, which had sought grand jury materials from the Mueller investigation, finding their impeachment inquiry into President Donald Trump to be a judicial proceeding. Justice Department attorneys had previously asserted that congressional investigators had "not yet exhausted [their] available discovery tools,” arguments Howell said "smack of farce," as the administration had openly stated it would stonewall the investigation.

Personal life
Howell is married to Michael Rosenfeld, an executive producer at National Geographic Television & Film. They have three children.

Publications
 Beryl Howell, "Lawyers on the Hook: Counsel’s Professional Responsibility to Provide Quality Assurance in Electronic Discovery", 2 J. Sec. L. Reg. & Compl. 216 (June 2009).
 Beryl Howell, "Real World Problems of Virtual Crime, in Cybercrime: Digital Cops in a Networked Environment" (Jack M. Balkin et al., New York University Press 2007).
 Beryl Howell & Dana J. Lesemann, "FISA’s Fruits in Criminal Cases: An Opportunity for Improved Accountability", 12 UCLA J. Intl. L. & For. Affairs 145 (Spring 2007).
 Beryl A. Howell & Richard J. Wolf, "Rough Waters Ahead for E-discovery and the New Federal Rules of Civil Procedure," ACC Docket (January/February 2007).
 Beryl Howell, "What You Need to Know About Digital Forensics," 28 Pa. Law. 32 (2006).
 Beryl Howell, "Foreign Intelligence Surveillance Act: Has the Solution Become the Problem?", in Protecting What Matters: Technology, Security, and Liberty Since 9/11 (Clayton Northouse, Brookings Institution Press 2006).
 Beryl Howell, "Perspectives on the USA PATRIOT Act" (Pennsylvania Bar Association Quarterly, January 2005).
 Beryl Howell, "Seven Weeks: The Making of the USA Patriot Act", 72 Geo. Wash. L. Rev. 1145 (2004).
 Beryl Howell & Eric Friedberg, 21st Century Forensics: Searching for the "Smoking Gun" in Computer Hard Drives," 37 Prosecutor 18 (2003).

References

External links

1956 births
Living people
Assistant United States Attorneys
Bryn Mawr College alumni
Columbia Law School alumni
Judges of the United States District Court for the District of Columbia
Members of the United States Sentencing Commission
United States district court judges appointed by Barack Obama
21st-century American judges
21st-century American women judges